9th NSFC Awards
January 5, 1975

Best Film: 
 Scenes from a Marriage 
The 9th National Society of Film Critics Awards, given on 5 January 1975, honored the best filmmaking of 1974.

Winners

Best Picture 
Scenes from a Marriage (Scener ur ett äktenskap)

Best Director 
Francis Ford Coppola – The Godfather Part II and The Conversation
Runners-up: Ingmar Bergman – Scenes from a Marriage and Federico Fellini – Amarcord

Best Actor 
Jack Nicholson – Chinatown and The Last Detail

Best Actress 
Liv Ullmann – Scenes from a Marriage (Scener ur ett äktenskap)

Best Supporting Actor 
Holger Löwenadler – Lacombe, Lucien

Best Supporting Actress 
Bibi Andersson – Scenes from a Marriage (Scener ur ett äktenskap)

Best Screenplay 
Ingmar Bergman – Scenes from a Marriage (Scener ur ett äktenskap)

Best Cinematography 
Gordon Willis – The Godfather Part II and The Parallax View

Special Award 
Jean Renoir

References

External links
Past Awards

1974
National Society of Film Critics Awards
National Society of Film Critics Awards
National Society of Film Critics Awards